Pauline Hamill (born 18 December 1971) is a Scottish former female international football forward who retired in 2011 while playing for Celtic in the Scottish Women's Premier League. A left–sided winger or forward, Hamill enjoyed a long career at club level with spells in Iceland and England.

Hamill made her senior Scotland debut in 1992 and amassed 141 appearances. She was the first woman to reach 100 caps for Scotland and her total was the highest by any Scottish player, male or female, at the time of her retirement.

Club career
Brought up in Airdrie, Hamill played for Craigburn Boys U-12s and Coltness Ladies before commencing her senior career with 13 years at Cumbernauld Ladies.

Playing for Stenhousemuir in 1999–00, Hamill failed to score in a 9–0 Scottish Women's Cup final win over Clyde.

After switching to Kilmarnock Ladies, Hamill spent the 2001 summer season in Iceland with ÍBV and scored 16 goals in the Úrvalsdeild. Back with Kilmarnock for the following season, Hamill scored in the Ayrshire club's 2-0 Women's Scottish Cup final win over local rivals Ayr United.

Hamill then joined Hibernian Ladies and, in July 2004, made her debut in European club competition with the Hibees. In summer 2005 Hamill signed for English Premier League team Doncaster Rovers Belles, where she impressed as a goalscoring midfielder. After a short spell back with Hibernian, Hamill returned to England in January 2008 and finished 2007–08 with Blackburn Rovers Ladies.

Hamill joined Spartans Women ahead of the 2010 Scottish Women's Premier League season. She had been playing for Celtic in the intervening period. Hamill returned to Celtic for season 2011.

International career
Hamill made her senior Scotland debut in a 1-0 Euro 1993 qualifier defeat to England in Walsall on 17 April 1992. In August 2007 Hamill became the first female player to win 100 caps for Scotland, in a friendly against Belgium at McDiarmid Park. Two months later Hamill won her 103rd cap, scoring in a 3–0 away win over Slovakia, overtaking Kenny Dalglish's record of 102 and becoming Scotland's most capped footballer of all time. Her 141st and last cap for the national team was in an away draw versus Denmark in 2010; her 29th and final goal against Bulgaria two months earlier had set a record as Scotland's oldest goalscorer (aged 38 years, 183 days) which still stands.

International goals

Coaching career
In July 2003 Hamill became the first ever female coach at Rangers FC, when she was appointed to a youth development role at the Murray Park training complex.

In 2010, while still playing at club level, Hamill was appointed head coach of the Scotland women's under-17 squad, a position she held until 2017 when she moved up to the same role with the under 19s. She also headed up the SFA Women's National Academy at the University of Stirling, and holds a UEFA Pro Licence as a coach.

See also
 List of women's footballers with 100 or more caps
 Scottish FA Women's International Roll of Honour

References

External links
Pauline Hamill at FIFA.com
 Pauline Hamill at North Lanarkshire Sporting Hall of Fame

1971 births
Living people
Footballers from Airdrie, North Lanarkshire
Scottish women's footballers
Scotland women's international footballers
Doncaster Rovers Belles L.F.C. players
Blackburn Rovers L.F.C. players
Hibernian W.F.C. players
FA Women's National League players
FIFA Century Club
Celtic F.C. Women players
F.C. Kilmarnock Ladies players
Women's association football wingers
Women's association football forwards
Pauline Hamill
Scottish expatriate sportspeople in Iceland
Scottish expatriate women's footballers
Expatriate women's footballers in Iceland
Spartans W.F.C. players
Rangers F.C. non-playing staff
Female association football managers
Women's association football managers
Scottish football managers